Reza Jafari is an Iranian football forward who plays for Saipa in the Persian Gulf Pro League.

References

1997 births
Living people
Iranian footballers
Association football forwards
Saipa F.C. players